Elkwater is an unincorporated community at the western edge of the Cypress Hills in southeastern Alberta, Canada,  southeast of Medicine Hat. The main access route is via Alberta Highway 41 (Buffalo Trail), which leads south from the Trans-Canada Highway (Alberta Highway 1).

The former hamlet is located within Cypress Hills Interprovincial Park on the southern shore of Elkwater Lake and consists mostly of a collection of cabins. Its name is a translation of Ponokiokwe, the Blackfoot name for the lake.

Flora and fauna 
The Elkwater townsite lies at an elevation of about 1,225 m (4,025 ft) on the northwest slope of the Cypress Hills which, with a summit at 1,466 m (4810 ft), are the highest point between the Rocky Mountains and Labrador within Canada. Because of the elevation, the area receives more moisture than the surrounding plains. Forests of lodgepole pine, white spruce, and aspen cover the north-facing slopes above the town. Large animals include mule deer, white-tailed deer, coyote, elk, cougar, and moose, and many types of birds. Moose and wild turkeys were introduced to the area and are not native.  Furthermore, there is a large lake that has northern pike and yellow perch.  Nearby lakes such as Reesor Lake also have fishing available.  Sport fishing Licenses are available online or can be acquired from the Elkwater Visitor Centre.

Demographics 

Administration 
Since the Elkwater townsite is in a provincial park, it is administered by the provincial government. Residents can never own the land on which their cottages or homes are built and leases must be negotiated with the provincial government.

Accommodation 
Elkwater has one hotel, the Elkwater Lake Lodge & Resort, which features condos, cabins, and suites.

There are 7 campgrounds near the townsite with approximately 450 campsites. They are:

 Elkwater (Main)
 Lakeview
 Old Baldy
 Beaver Creek 
 Ferguson Hill
 Lodgepole
 Firerock

To the east of Elkwater, camping can be found at Spruce Coulee and Reesor Lake.  Closer to the Saskatchewan border, you will find Battle Creek campground. Four group camp sites are also available to rent.

Elkwater also has bed-and-breakfast and other accommodations at the Bar-Zee Bed & Breakfast, located north of the park.

Other services and facilities 
Services and facilities include a convenience store, gas station, cafe, restaurant, visitor centre, ski hill, 9-hole golf course and a marina. Park administration offices for the Alberta section of the park are also located here.

Climate 
Elkwater experiences a subarctic climate (Köppen climate classification Dfc) that falls just short of the boundary with the humid continental climate zone (Köppen Dfb). Winters are long and cold, while summers are short and warm. Precipitation is moderate, with an annual average of 529mm.

See also 
List of communities in Alberta
List of designated places in Alberta

References

External links
Elkwater Lake Lodge & Resort

Designated places in Alberta
Localities in Cypress County